Hail of Bullets was a Dutch old school death metal supergroup from Rotterdam. The band's lyrical content deals with the Second World War, and is based upon the research of vocalist Martin van Drunen, who has been described as the band's "resident historian". The band has released three albums via Metal Blade Records.

History
Hail of Bullets formed at the end of 2006 when guitarist Stephan Gebédi recruited singer Martin van Drunen, drummer Ed Warby, bass player Theo van Eekelen and guitarist Paul Baayens for an old school death metal band. The band members already knew each other from their previous and present bands like Asphyx, Gorefest, Thanatos, and Houwitser. Hail of Bullets was influenced by old school death metal bands like Autopsy, Massacre, Bolt Thrower, early Death as well as Celtic Frost.  As drummer Ed Warby relates, the band formed "after a night of hard drinking" when the members, hung over, decided to "bring back the old school values that we felt were sorely missing from modern day death metal."

In July 2007 the band recorded a four song promotional CD. Dan Swanö produced the four songs at Unisound Studios. Metal Blade Records released the band's debut album …Of Frost and War in May 2008.  The album focused on the Eastern Front during World War II, first from the German perspective and then from the Soviet perspective as the tide of the battle turned at Stalingrad.

The debut album was followed by a six-track mini album in July 2009, entitled Warsaw Rising which featured two brand new songs, a cover version of Twisted Sister's 'Destroyer' plus three live tracks. More shows followed and the band made its first visit to the USA at 2009's Maryland Deathfest.

In the beginning of 2010 the band started work on its second full-length album, which focused upon the Pacific Campaign of World War II.  Mick Koopman provided the artwork. The album was produced by Ed Warby and the mix was again handled by Dan Swanö.  On Divine Winds was released in October 2010. The album entered the German album charts and was voted 'album of the month' in metal magazines such as Rock Hard (Germany), Legacy (Germany), and Terrorizer (UK).

2011 saw the band playing most of the prestigious European Summer festivals Like Hellfest, Wacken Open Air, Summer Breeze, Party.San Open Air festival, and Brutal Assault.

In 2013, the band announced that it would be returning to the studio in February to record its third full-length album, which was released on 25 October 2013 via Metal Blade Records.  Dan Swanö again mixed and mastered the album, with production duties falling to Ed Warby. Titled III: The Rommel Chronicles, the album shifted from a focus upon a particular theatre of war to the biography of German Field Marshal Erwin Rommel. Cover art was provided by Dutch artist Erik Wijnands.

At the end of 2015 Hail of Bullets parted ways with singer Martin van Drunen because of personal issues. Dave Ingram (ex-Bolt Thrower/Benediction, Down Among the Dead Men) handled vocal duties for the band's appearance at the Maryland Deathfest; at the conclusion of the band's set, Ingram was announced as a permanent replacement.

The band announced their disbandment in March 2017.

Members

Final lineup 
Paul Baayens – guitars (2006–2017)
Stephan Gebédi – guitars (2006–2017)
Theo Van Eekelen – bass guitar (2006–2017)
Ed Warby – drums (2006–2017)
Dave Ingram – vocals (2016–2017)

Former members 
Martin van Drunen – vocals (2006–2015)

Discography

Demo albums 
Hail of Bullets (self-released, 2007)

EPs 
Warsaw Rising (Metal Blade, (2009)

Albums 
…Of Frost and War (Metal Blade, 2008)
On Divine Winds (Metal Blade, 2010)
III: The Rommel Chronicles (Metal Blade, 2013)

References

External links 

Dutch death metal musical groups
Musical groups from Rotterdam
Musical groups established in 2006
Metal Blade Records artists
Musical quintets